The 1999 XXXV FIBA International Christmas Tournament "Trofeo Raimundo Saporta-Memorial Fernando Martín" was the 35th edition of the FIBA International Christmas Tournament. It took place at Raimundo Saporta Pavilion, Madrid, Spain, on 24 and 25 December 1999 with the participations of Real Madrid Teka, Panathinaikos (champions of the 1998–99 Greek Basket League), Partizan (champions of the 1998–99 Yugoslav Basketball Cup) and Zadar (runners-up of the 1998–99 A-1 Liga).

Semifinals

December 24, 1999

|}

3rd place game

December 25, 1999

|}

Final

December 25, 1999

|}

Final standings

References

1999–2000 in European basketball
1999–2000 in Greek basketball
1999–2000 in Spanish basketball